Christine Lindsay-Abaire ( Lindsay) is an American stage and film actress. 

She is married to Pulitzer Prize winning playwright, David Lindsay-Abaire. They live in Brooklyn, New York.

References

External links
 

Living people
Year of birth missing (living people)
People from Brooklyn
Actresses from New York City
American stage actresses
Place of birth missing (living people)
21st-century American women